The Bill Cunningham Show is an American television tabloid talk show hosted by radio host Bill Cunningham which aired for four of its five seasons on The CW as part of that network's daytime hour. The Bill Cunningham Show, produced by ITV Studios America, debuted on September 19, 2011, and lasted until September 9, 2016. In the first season before the move to the CW, the program had limited distribution, airing only on Tribune Broadcasting owned stations, such as KAUT-TV—Oklahoma City, WGNT–Norfolk, and Raycom Media-owned WXIX-TV in Cunningham's hometown of Cincinnati.

In February 2012, The CW announced that the program would be distributed nationwide for the 2012–13 season, as part of the network's CW Daytime lineup; the series made its CW debut on September 17, 2012, replacing Dr. Drew's Lifechangers.

In November 2013, The Bill Cunningham Show was renewed for a fourth season.

On May 27, 2016, Cunningham announced that he would not sign a new contract, resulting in cancellation of the show. The Robert Irvine Show, hosted by Robert Irvine, replaced it on September 12, 2016.

Background
The series offers the traditional tabloid-style conflict-resolution format with Cunningham's conservative point of view on the subjects presented.  An expert weighs in and comments with questions and comments from audience members. The hour-long show is taped in front of a live audience at NEP Broadcasting's Penn Studios.  The show is produced by former Montel producer Kim Brechka.

Ratings
In New York City, where the show airs locally on CW affiliate WPIX, The Bill Cunningham Show averaged a 0.7 in adults 18–49 in January — better than any other talk show in the market, across all timeslots. On February 9, 2012, it won its time slot with a 1.2 rating in adults 25–54 (it also finished first in that time slot in the demo in Los Angeles and Dallas). During the second week of the February 2012 sweeps period (through February 9), airings of The Bill Cunningham Show on WPIX averaged a 1.4 household rating.

Cancellation
On May 27, 2016, Cunningham announced that he had opted not to sign a new contract to continue the show, citing a grinding taping schedule which included recording all the episodes of the last season of the series between August and September 2015 before the season started, which kept him away from family in Cincinnati and disrupted the schedule for his WLW radio show. The new contract also included a non-negotiable three-year commitment that Cunningham was unable to agree to. The Robert Irvine Show, a talk show hosted by Food Network personality Robert Irvine, replaced it in September 2016.

References

External links 
  (archived version from 2018-03-21)

2010s American television talk shows
2011 American television series debuts
2016 American television series endings
American television talk shows
English-language television shows
First-run syndicated television programs in the United States
Television series by ITV Studios
Television series by Tribune Entertainment
The CW original programming